Rankings of universities in Southeast Asia have been published by QS World University Rankings, Times Higher Education and others.

QS World University Rankings

QS World Best Student Cities

QS Academic World University Rankings

QS Asian University Rankings

QS World University Rankings by Subject: Art & Humanity

QS World University Rankings by Subject: Engineering & Technology

QS World University Rankings by Subject: Life Science and Medicine

QS World University Rankings by Subject: Natural Science

QS World University Rankings by Subject: Social Science Management

Times Higher Education World University Rankings

Times Higher Education University Impact Rankings

Times Higher Education Young University Rankings
Formerly known as Times Higher Education 100 Under 50 University Rankings

Times Higher Education Asia University Rankings

Times Higher Education Emerging Economies University Rankings
Formerly known as Times Higher Education BRICS & Emerging Economies University Rankings

Edurank University Rankings

References

University and college rankings